Othello Methelda Henderson III (born August 23, 1972) is a former American football defensive back who played two seasons with the New Orleans Saints of the National Football League (NFL). He was drafted by the New Orleans Saints in the seventh round of the 1993 NFL Draft. He played college football at the University of California, Los Angeles and attended Ellison High School in Killeen, Texas.

References

External links
Just Sports Stats
College stats

Living people
1972 births
Players of American football from Texas
American football defensive backs
African-American players of American football
UCLA Bruins football players
New Orleans Saints players
Sportspeople from Killeen, Texas
21st-century African-American sportspeople
20th-century African-American sportspeople